The 1976 Kentucky Derby was the 102nd running of the Kentucky Derby. The race took place on May 1, 1976, with 115,387 people in attendance.

Full results

 Winning Breeder: Eaton Farms Inc. & Red Bull Stable; (KY)

References

1976
Kentucky Derby
Derby
Kentucky
Kentucky Derby